Aidan McCullen (born 5 January 1977) is a businessman and retired Ireland national rugby union team player. He played as a back rower, principally at blindside flanker but also as an openside, no.8 and occasionally in the second row. He played for the Ireland national rugby sevens team in a number of competitions, including Hong Kong Sevens and the 2001 Rugby World Cup Sevens.

McCullen is married to former Miss Ireland model Niamh Redmond. They have two sons.

Rugby career

McCullen started playing rugby at Castleknock College after moving to Dublin from County Meath. McCullen played for Leinster at schools, and captained the Leinster under 19s and under 20s before representing Ireland at under 21 level.

In 1998, after playing for Ireland under-21s, he played a season for US Dax in that year's French first division before joining Lansdowne Football Club in the All-Ireland League.

McCullen then joined Leinster Rugby in 2001 as Ireland moved away from the All-Ireland League and towards the Celtic league. That season he also played for Ireland sevens in the 2001 Rugby World Cup Sevens. He had 60 caps for Leinster and gained an international 15s cap for the game between Ireland and Samoa on 20 June 2003. His international career was halted by injury, before he was signed by Toulouse. McCullen was in the starting Toulouse team, but his time at Toulouse was once again impacted by injury. He then joined London Irish until 2008. McCullen returned to Ireland and coached his club side Lansdowne back to division one as a forwards' player/coach.

For several years, McCullen commentated for Setanta Sports (now Eir Sports) covering the French Top 14, International games and schools rugby.

Business career

McCullen set up and developed the digital infrastructure for the Communicorp Group. As "head of digital at Communicorp", he promoted the concept of "Radio You Can Read", which was an iPad magazine for the radio station Newstalk 106–108.

McCullen was recruited by Ireland's national broadcaster RTÉ as "Head of Innovation Partnerships and Funding" in January 2016. Between 2017 and 2019, McCullen worked with the "business think tank" Katawave.

As of 2021, he was presenting a weekly radio show called "The Innovation Show" which is published online, and broadcast on RTÉ Radio 1 Extra on Saturday afternoons. In 2021, McCullen published the Amazon book "Undisruptable: A Mindset of Permanent Reinvention for Individuals, Organisations and Life". 

McCullen is a consultant, speaker, and lecturer in Trinity College Business School He is also a non-executive board director for National Broadband Ireland and The Rise Global Foundation

in 2023, McCullen launched an initiative to document all the works and theories of Clayton Christensen.

References

External links
ERC Rugby – Player profile (archived)
lansdownerugby.com – 1st XV (archived)
Aidan McCullen on scrum.com

Irish rugby union players
Ireland international rugby union players
Living people
1977 births
Ireland international rugby sevens players
Lansdowne Football Club players
US Dax players
Leinster Rugby players
Stade Toulousain players
London Irish players
Rugby union players from Dublin (city)
RTÉ Radio 1 presenters
Irish expatriate rugby union players
Irish expatriate sportspeople in England
Irish expatriate sportspeople in France
Expatriate rugby union players in France
Expatriate rugby union players in England